Circuito Montañés is a road cycling stage race held annually in Cantabria, Spain. The editions 1986–1995 were reserved to amateurs. Since 2005, the race has been organized as a 2.2 event on the UCI Europe Tour.

Winners

External links
Official website 

UCI Europe Tour races
Cycle racing in Cantabria
Cycle races in Spain
Recurring sporting events established in 1954
1954 establishments in Spain